David Mark Ritcey (born October 10, 1971) is a Canadian politician, who was elected to the Nova Scotia House of Assembly in a by-election on March 10, 2020. A member of the Progressive Conservative Association of Nova Scotia, he represents the electoral district of Truro-Bible Hill-Millbrook-Salmon River. He  has had many years of hockey coaching experience and is a former interim president of the Maritime Junior Hockey League. His grandfather, Gerald Ritcey, had been a MLA for Colchester, parts of which became the current riding, from 1968 to 1974.

Electoral record

2021 general election

2020 by-election results

References

1971 births
Living people
People from Truro, Nova Scotia
Progressive Conservative Association of Nova Scotia MLAs
21st-century Canadian politicians